The Auburn Cord Duesenberg Automobile Museum is an automobile museum located in Auburn, Indiana in the United States. Opened in 1974, it is dedicated to preserving cars built by Auburn Automobile, Cord Automobile, and Duesenberg Motors Company.

Facility
The museum is located in the former administration building of the Auburn Automobile Company, which operated on this property from the early 20th century until its closure in 1937. The building, along with the adjacent service and new parts building, and the L-29 building now occupied by the National Auto & Truck Museum, were together declared a National Historic Landmark in 2005. This complex was recognized as one of the nation's best-preserved examples of an independent auto company's facilities. The showroom and administrative buildings were designed by architect Alvin M. Strauss in Art Deco style and were built in 1930. After its closure, the administration building housed a business selling original and reproduction parts for a number of discontinued manufacturers, including the Auburn, Cord, and Duesenberg nameplates, until 1960.

Exhibits and collections
The museum is organized into seven galleries that display over 120 cars and related exhibits such as restored Auburn Automobile company offices. Some exhibits have interactive kiosks that allow a visitor to hear the sounds the car makes and to see related videos and photographs that show the engineering that went into its design.

References

External links

Industrial buildings and structures on the National Register of Historic Places in Indiana
Automobile museums in Indiana
Auburn, Indiana
Historic districts on the National Register of Historic Places in Indiana
National Historic Landmarks in Indiana
Industrial buildings completed in 1930
Museums in DeKalb County, Indiana
Art Deco architecture in Indiana
Institutions accredited by the American Alliance of Museums
Motor vehicle assembly plants in Indiana
National Register of Historic Places in DeKalb County, Indiana
1930 establishments in Indiana
Motor vehicle manufacturing plants on the National Register of Historic Places
Transportation on the National Register of Historic Places in Indiana

Auto dealerships on the National Register of Historic Places